Sherlie Matthews (born November 10, 1934) is an American singer, songwriter and former Motown Records producer, best known as a backing vocalist for pop, R&B and rock groups from the mid-1960s to the present time.

Early life
Matthews started performing as a soloist in church at the age of two. Then at age four, she began harmonizing. She sang alto parts in vocal duets with her two-year-old sister. Her grandmother, who was an accomplished musician/composer, recognized her musical talents and was her first piano/voice teacher and mentor. She provided piano accompaniment for herself and her sister for many years at various local venues, tea parties, weddings, church services, concerts, etc. From her early nurturing, Matthews continued to develop her natural abilities,(which includes a five octave vocal range) for all phases of the performing arts, through school, college, community and professional workshops. At the age of 10 years she began setting Bible verses to music to help children learn Bible texts. After earning a BA in Pre-Social Welfare from UCLA, she earned her living for several years as a medical social worker before embarking on a successful career in the music industry, reflected by her substantial resume.

Mirwood
Employing her as both a lyricist and composer, she created many of the 1960s and 1970s hits for Mirwood Records' artists, including Jackie Lee, The Olympics, Bobby Garrett, The Mirettes, The Belles and Bob & Earl.

Motown
Frank Wilson, a personal friend, who was a producer/writer with Motown Records, enhanced her professional career when he introduced her to that Label in December 1964. Soon thereafter, she was signed as a singer-songwriter/producer.  She performed with Diana Ross and Lionel Richie and the Commodores on-stage and wrote and produced recordings for: The Jackson 5, The Supremes, Diana Ross & Marvin Gaye, Martha and the Vandellas, the Four Tops, The Celebration, Stacie Johnson, and The Blackberries, a trio that she formed with fellow backing vocalists, Venetta Fields and Clydie King.  She also collaborated with the songwriter and producer, Deke Richards, on many of the above projects, which included the co-production of The Jackson Five recording two songs from the musical, Pippin: namely, "Corner of the Sky" and "Skywriter" and the group Celebration, which released an album on Motown's Mowest label.

Session singing credits
Her voice has become a familiar sound as a result of extensive work in voice-overs, commercials and as backup vocalist for many popular recording artists, including Steely Dan, B.B. King, Barbra Streisand, Quincy Jones, Rita Coolidge & Kris Kristofferson, Burt Bacharach, Linda Ronstadt, Cher, The Rolling Stones, Lionel Richie, Ike & Tina Turner, Bill Cosby, Paul McCartney & Wings, Ella Fitzgerald, Billy Eckstine (Senior Soul, 1972), Steppenwolf, Neil Diamond, Bob Seger, The Temptations, Humble Pie, The Beach Boys, Seals and Crofts, Richard Harris, Crosby, Stills & Nash, Dickey Betts, Bob Dylan, Chuck Girard, Elton John and Keith Moon...plus hundreds of notable artists.

Several of the hundreds of recordings she appeared on are: "Stayin' Alive" with the Bee Gees, "Signed, Sealed, Delivered I'm Yours" with Stevie Wonder, The "Aja" Album with Steely Dan, "The Bitch Is Back" with Elton John, and "Take Me in Your Arms (Rock Me a Little While)" and "I Been Workin' On You" with The Doobie Brothers, "You're No Good" with Linda Ronstadt,  "Feelin' Alright" with Joe Cocker, "Sweet Home Alabama" with Lynard Skynard, (Matthews remembers completing the singer's AFTRA recording contract during the recording session and asking the producer, How to spell the band's name)   A full list of credits is on her official website.

Melbourne, Australia
She lived and worked in Australia from 1984 through 1988. While there she sang backing vocals for Australian Crawl, John Justin, John Farnham, Joe Camilleri, Renée Geyer, Peter Blakeley, Richard Clapton, Stephen Cummings, Swanee, David Reyne, Beeb Birtles, Red Symons, Cattletruck, Paul Agar, Max Merritt, Tim Finn, Martin Armiger, One World, The Arc of Baghdad and Venetta Fields' groups, Venetta's Taxi and The Gospel Jubilee and Yu-En.

Matthews recorded several commercials and voice overs in addition to performing on-stage and recording as one of the lead singers with  ZwaDaVee and The Hi Tones.

She formed the children's performing group "Babe" and wrote and produced two songs for them:  "A Fuzzy Ball Of Fur" and "A Christmas Medley". The eight-member group made several public and TV appearances under her guidance. She continued working with them until her family's situation demanded her full-time help and she had to return to the United States.  Upon her return she resumed working in the entertainment industry, while earning an additional degree from UCLA in Computer Graphics/Animation.

2000s
In June 2005, she accepted an invitation from Adrian Croasdell of Ace Records, London, to sing for a weekend concert.  With vocalists, Jim Gilstrap and Marva Holiday, she performed many of her originals from the Mirwood era for a 1960s and 1970s music-loving crowd at a Cleethorpes venue.

In 2008 she released a solo CD of original songs, We Come As One.  With her sister and co-writer, she is also released a CD of original children's songs, A Band Of Angels.  The 2009 Motown 50th anniversary album contained two songs that Matthews wrote, co-produced and sang with her former group The Blackberries.  The songs included are: "But I Love You More" and "Somebody Up There Help Me."  Her 2010 solo release was "I'm A Cute Little Gay Boy, Inside". She has written and arranged over 500 songs, both secular and sacred.  Many of these have been recorded.  She's also written three children's musical comedies, two movie themes, and several commercials.

We Are All the Same Inside
We Are All the Same Inside is a 2000 children's picture book by Timothy Bellavia, which earned a Christopher Award nomination for Best Children's Picture Book. 2010 marked the tenth anniversary publication of We Are All the Same Inside and the Sage doll-making workshop. A special 10th anniversary version of the book was released in 2010. The reissued picture book featured paper doll patterns, teacher curriculum, a 10-year chronology, and rare photographs. To commemorate the anniversary, singer, songwriter and former Motown Records producer Sherlie Matthews co-wrote and co-produced a special children's multi-track compact disc. The Brooklyn Historical Society hosted a We Are All the Same Inside Sage doll-making workshop on October 24, 2010.

References

External links

Blackberries
Jackson5abc.com
Sherlie Matthews "We Are All The Same Inside" children's CD announced in Broadway World
Sherlie Matthews interview by Rob Jones

1934 births
Living people
American women singer-songwriters
Record producers from California
American session musicians
Singers with a five-octave vocal range
Singer-songwriters from California
American women record producers
21st-century American women
The Blackberries members